Phan may refer to:

 Phan (surname), a Vietnamese family name
 Phan District, Chiang Rai Province, Thailand
 Phan River, Bình Thuận Province, Vietnam
 Phan (tray), a tray with a pedestal, used often for ritual offerings